John Lang (born 9 June 1908) was a Scottish footballer who played for Dumbarton, King's Park, Aberdeen and Barnsley, mostly as an outside left. He appeared in the 1937 Scottish Cup Final which Aberdeen lost 2–1 to Celtic.

References

1908 births
Year of death missing
Scottish footballers
Dumbarton F.C. players
Aberdeen F.C. players
Sportspeople from Dumbarton
Footballers from West Dunbartonshire
Barnsley F.C. players
Maryhill F.C. players
Scottish Junior Football Association players
Scottish Football League players
English Football League players
King's Park F.C. players
Association football outside forwards
Dumbarton F.C. wartime guest players